= Eaton Building =

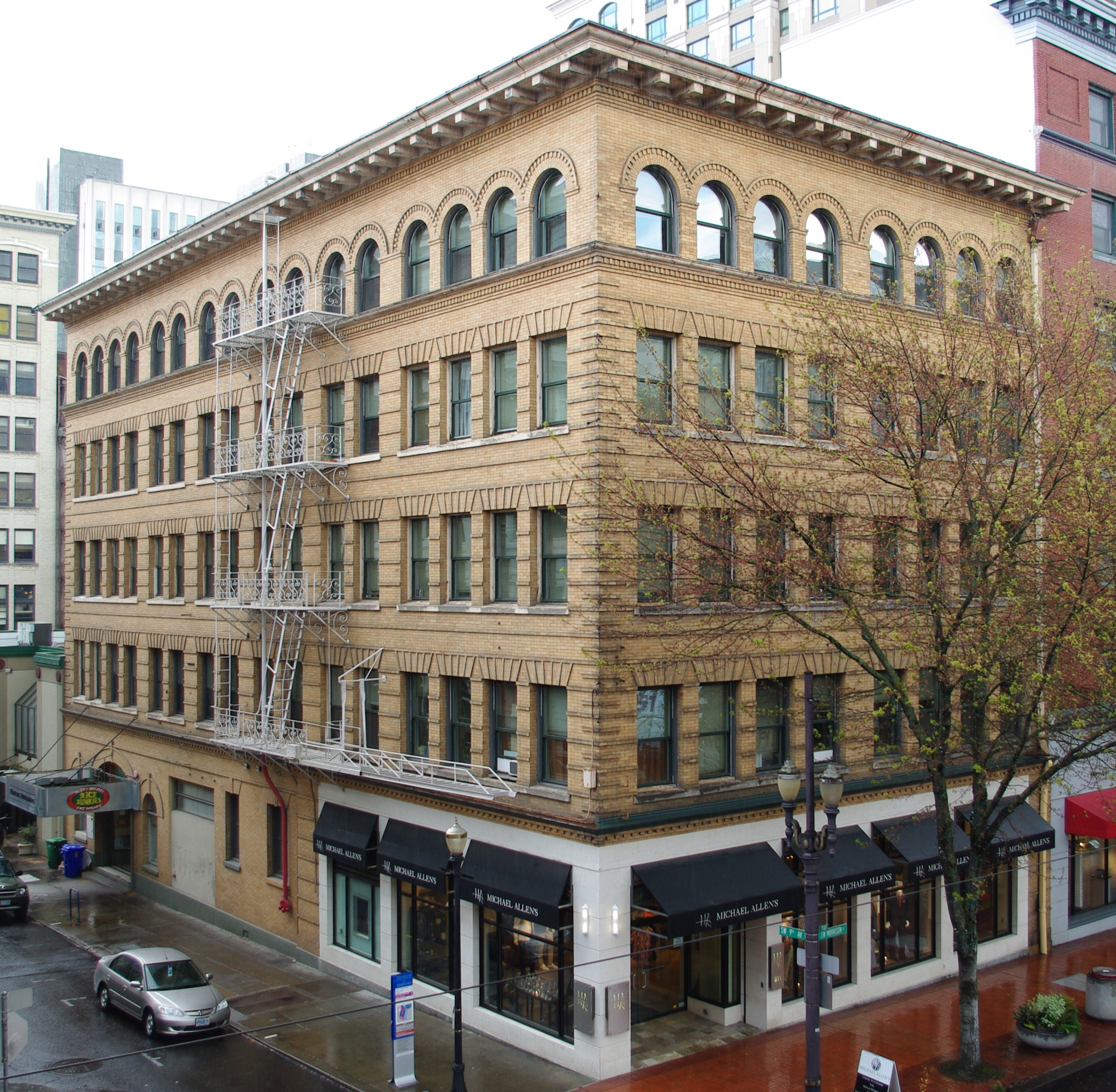
- The building's exterior in 2010
- Interactive map of the Eaton Building area

General information
- Location: Portland, Oregon, United States
- Coordinates: 45°31′12″N 122°40′51″W

The Eaton Building is an historic building in Portland, Oregon, completed in 1905.
